Wassaic station is a commuter rail stop on the Metro-North Railroad's Harlem Line, located in Amenia, New York. It is the northern terminal of the Harlem Line. 

The station is located on New York 22/343 just north of the hamlet of Wassaic.

History
The first Wassaic train station was about a half-mile south of its current location and was situated in the actual town section of Wassaic. The station operated by New York and Harlem Railroad, and later New York Central Railroad served the surrounding village area, as well as towns even as far as Connecticut. Freight service was provided for mainly three industries in Wassaic, the Tri-Wall Container Corporation and Maxxon Mills Feeds. Bordens Milk operated a factory in the hamlet of which there was a side track provided for the purpose of transporting milk to points south. A furnace was located nearby and an early hotel, "The Wassaic House" was erected in 1851, following the construction of the railroad. In 1968, the railroad merged with longtime rival Pennsylvania Railroad to form Penn Central Railroad, and thus the station and line became property of the newly merged railroad. On March 20, 1972 Penn Central abandoned service north of Dover, and in 1990, rails were removed from Millerton south to milepost 81.33 which became the northernmost point of the freight operation by Penn Central on the Harlem Line.

The physical end of the track is located just north of the current Wassaic yard, at mile post 83.68, there is no track or railroad past that point, but the roadbed, which is still visible, is slowly being reclaimed by nature. The Harlem Valley Rail Trail now operates a paved trail over the existing road bed. Some 45.8 miles (35.9%) of track have been removed in two stages following some bitter court battles.

Before the station reopened on July 9, 2000, Metro-North Railroad rehabilitated the tracks and grade crossings that existed north of Dover Plains and moved the physical location of the Wassaic train station to approximately one half mile north of the old station and constructed a new rail yard facility. The moving of the station to the new location resulted in the re-laying of tracks over the existing rail bed approximately three quarters of a mile where the tracks end.

Station layout
The station has one four-car-long high-level side platform to the east of the track. A small storage yard exists to the north of the station platform.

References

External links

Rail Nice Views in Dutchess County (1999) and Extending The Harlem Line (2000)
 Station from Google Maps Street View

Metro-North Railroad stations in New York (state)
Former New York Central Railroad stations
Railway stations in the United States opened in 1857
Railway stations closed in 1972
Railway stations in the United States opened in 2000
Amenia, New York
Railway stations in Dutchess County, New York
1857 establishments in New York (state)
Transportation in Dutchess County, New York